Uluveo Island (also called Maskelyne) is a small, inhabited island in Malampa Province of Vanuatu in the Pacific Ocean. It is a part of the Maskelyne Islands archipelago.

Geography
Uluveo lies just off the south coasts of Malekula Island and Sakao Island. It has an upscale resort, and a sanctuary for giant clams called the Ringi Te Suh Marine Conservation Reserve.

Population
Uluveo is the main island in the archipelago and has three villages: Lutes, Pellonk, and Peskarus. Some of the local inhabitants speak the Uluveo language.

References

Islands of Vanuatu
Malampa Province